Patriot Front (Spanish: Frente Patriota) is a far-right ultranationalist political party in Argentina formed by the fusion of Bandera Vecinal and Gente en Acción parties in 2017. The political party has been described as a fascist, antisemitic and militarist political party. Its leader is Alejandro Biondini, a far-right politician with neo-Nazi tendencies.

History
It was officialized by the Court Supreme as a political alliance in 2017, after the union of Bandera Vecinal and Gente en Acción. It had a heavy controversy during 2017 Argentine legislative election in which the party was criticized because of receiving 20 million pesos for ballot print, but the National Electoral Council decided to decrease his funds, however the party printed all their ballots and presented their candidates nevertheless. Patriot Front took the case to the Jury and finally, the Court revoked the council's decision in favor of the party. In those elections, they gained 4,100 votes in Buenos Aires, and 28,500 votes in the province of Buenos Aires for national deputies and 31,500 for national senators.

Ideology 
The party is far-right and embraces fascist and neo-Nazi values. It is widely unpopular among the population, mainly because of its antisemistic and ultranationalist positions, its apologist position towards the military dictatorships of the country, and its support for a patriarchal society. 

Patriot Front has an online manifesto.
It follows an aggressive foreign policy, which includes good relations with neighbours, 
annexing the Falkland Islands and severing diplomatic relations with United Kingdom and Israel. It supports the Argentine Antarctica claim and oppose colonialism.

Patriot Front supports restoring conscription.

Presidential results 
For 2019 Argentine general election, Patriot Front presented Biondini as a candidate for president and Enrique Venturino as acandidate for Vice-president, but during primary vote, it obtained 0.24% and 58,944 of the total voters in the country. Having failed to have 1.5% of the required, it was disqualified from the elections.

References

External links
Official site

2011 establishments in Argentina
Fascism in Argentina
Neo-Nazism in Argentina
Neo-Nazi political parties
Peronist parties and alliances in Argentina
Political parties established in 2011
Political parties in Argentina
San Luis Province